Pagrati or Pangrati is a neighborhood in Central Athens, Greece, having an estimated population of 35,173 residents. Named after the ancient sanctuary of Hercules Pancrates ("All Powerful"), its frontage runs from Vasilissis Sofias Avenue along to Vasileos Konstantinou Avenue and Vassileos Alexandrou Avenue, just a few minutes walk from the National Gardens. One of the most important landmarks of Pagrati is the Panathinaiko Stadium that hosted the first modern Olympic Games in 1896. The First Cemetery of Athens, the official cemetery for the City of Athens, lies within the neighborhood's limits.

Pagrati includes the Ilissos river valley and extends to the south as far as the Panathinaic Stadium and the First Cemetery of Athens. Its eastern boundary was once defined by the Hymettus Mountain slopes but with the extension of the city in interwar period the modern eastern boundary is Nikiforidi Str. and Iliados Str., including Deliolani Square. To the north and northeast, the area fades into Hilton and National Gallery area, but it is considered that the area north of Vassileos Alexandrou Ave. as far north to Hilton Athens hotel  and northeast as Andreas Syngros Hospital is part of Pagrati. Pagrati is bordered by the Kolonaki (Κολωνάκι) neighborhood to the west, the Ilisia (Ιλίσια) neighborhood and the Kaisariani (Καισαριανή) municipality to the north, the Vyronas (Βύρωνας) and Dafni-Ymittos (Δάφνη-Υμηττός) municipalities to the east, and the Neos Kosmos (Νέος Κόσμος) neighborhood to the south. It is not to be confused as a separate suburb, as it is part of the City of Athens proper. However, it is frequently mistaken as such, possibly because of it bordering the actual suburbs of Vyronas and Kaisariani.

In the second decade of the 21st century, Pagrati has experienced a renaissance as a destination for hipsters, with concomitant gentrification, house price increases, and a decrease in housing affordability.

Squares 

Pangrati has numerous squares: Plastira, Pangratiou ("of Pangrati"), Messolongiou, Proskopon, Profitis Ilias, Agios Spyridon, Deliolani and Varnava. Pangrati Square is home to the Pangrati Park, together with a major street named Spirou Merkouri, which runs into Vassileos Konstantinou Ave and up towards Evangelismos Metro Station. Agios Spyridon Square features the Saint Spyridon Church and Profitis Ilias Square features the Church of the Prophet Elijah (Προφήτης Ηλίας), and the Imittou Avenue, which runs through the entire span of Pangrati starting from Kaisariani; around Varnava Square is the area behind the Kallimarmaro Stadium hosting classy restaurants and various tavernas, while Plastira Square serves as a stop for all three trolley networks and local bus routes. Proskopon Square, just behind the Presidential Mansion also hosts classy restaurants, bars and cafes.

Culture

Pangrati has attracted artists from all over Greece, who arrive in the city of Athens to educate themselves and to seek inspiration from its vast pool of artistic resources and galleries. Poets, novelists, writers, painters, composers, musicians made Pangrati one of the most important artistic hubs of Athens. One of the most important Greek poets of the 20th century and a Nobel laureate, Giorgos Seferis lived in Pangrati. Manos Hatzidakis who received an Academy Award for Best Original Song for his song Never on Sunday from the film of the same name, also lived in Pangrati. Other artists who lived in Pangrati include Nikiforos Vrettakos, Yiannis Moralis, Kostas Varnalis, Dimitris Psathas and many others.
 
The National Gallery of Athens, a museum primarily devoted to post-Byzantine Greek Art, renovated recently in a $71,60 million expansion project,  and the National Hellenic Research Foundation are located in Pangrati. Maria Callas, the famous soprano, has also studied in the Athens Conservatoire, which lies within Pangrati, just next to the Cult of Hercules Pankrates, directly beneath the Harry S. Truman statue in Vassileos Konstantinou Avenue. At Agios Spyridon Church in Pangrati, a new museum has changed the cultural map of Athens as the Goulandris Museum of Contemporary Art opened its gates in October 2019. The Goulandris Museum hosts a world class collection of works by Picasso, Chagall, Van Gogh, Gauguin, El Greco, Degas, Klee, Kandinsky, Rodin, Cézanne,  Monet, Miró, Giacometti, Pollock, Bacon and others as well as by prominent Greek artists including George Bouzianis, Yannis Tsarouchis, Nikos Hadjikyriakos-Ghika, Yannis Moralis and Michalis Tombos. Princeton University has recently inaugurated the Athens Center for Research and Hellenic Studies in Pangrati.  The Center is housed in the Stanley J. Seeger ’52 House, a 1930s-era townhouse. It is the one and only research and scholarship center of Princeton University anywhere outside of the United States.

Transportation 

Pangrati is served by Evangelismos metro station, by buses #054, 203, 204, 209, 732 and trolleys #2, 4 and 11. Recent information released by the Attiko Metro (the constructor of the Athens Metro) has suggested that there will be a future metro station on the border of Pangrati and Kaisariani on Imittou Street, to be named  Pangrati/Kaisariani,  on the proposed Orange Line (Line #4).

Notable people 

Archbishop Christodoulos of Athens
Dimitris Kataleifos, actor
Dora Bakoyianni, politician
Elli Kokkinou, singer
Alketas Panagoulias, football trainer
Yorgos Lanthimos, film director
Giorgos Seferis, diplomat and Nobel prize laureate poet
Karolos Papoulias, politician, former President of Greece
Kostas Karamanlis, politician, former Prime Minister of Greece
Manos Hatzidakis,  Academy Award winning composer
Milena Apostolaki, politician
Nikitas Kaklamanis, politician, former Mayor of Athens
Nikos Sergianopoulos, actor
Nico Minardos, actor
Thanos Mikroutsikos, composer 
Theodoros Pangalos, politician, Deputy Prime Minister of Greece, former Minister of Foreign Affairs
 Vaios Ekonomou, composer 
Nana Mouskouri, singer

References

Neighbourhoods in Athens